Persen is a surname and may refer to:
 John Persen (1941–2014), Norwegian composer
 Mari Boine Persen (born) 1956), Norwegian Sami musician
 Synnøve Persen (born 1950), Norwegian Sami poet and artist

Persen is also:
 the old German name of Pergine Valsugana, comune in Trentino

Danish-language surnames
Norwegian-language surnames